Apostolis "Smealinho" Rama (born April 30, 1992) is a Greek mixed martial artist currently competing in the Light Heavyweight division. He competed in the  Professional Fighters League, where he was the promotion's inaugural Heavyweight Champion, and also competed in the MFC.

Mixed martial arts career

Maximum Fighting Championship
Rama made his MFC debut against Canadian Lee Mein at MFC 34: Total Recall. Rama was superior and won by technical knockout in the first round.

Then Rama made a fight in the BFTB, facing Jordan Tracey, in Battle for the Border 1: Blue Plates Vs. Red Plates, and won with a kimura in the first round.

His return to MFC was against Canadian Ryan Fortin at MFC 35: Explosive Encounter. Rama won the first round finals.

At MFC 36, Rama faced Mike Hackert, and knocked him out in the first round.

With a six-game winning streak in MMA, three in MFC, Rama played MFC's Heavyweight Heavyweight belt against future UFC fighter Anthony Hamilton. Rama was knocked out early in the second round with a kick in the head, losing his unbeaten record.

World Series of Fighting/Professional Fighters League
Rama made his debut on WSOF against Steve Mocco on February 21, 2014 at WSOF Canada 1: Ford vs. Powell. Rama dominated the fight and won by unanimous decision.

Rama won a fight in the Unified MMA against UFC veteran Tim Hague and returned to the WSOF to contest the WSOF Heavyweight Championship on October 11, 2014 against Derrick Mehmen. He knocked out the American with 51 seconds of fighting and won the title.

His first defense was against Blagoi Ivanov, on WSOF 21, on June 5, 2015. Rama was submitted with a guillotine in the third round and lost his belt.

After the loss, Rama decided to go down to light heavyweight, and succeeded, as in his next bout he knocked out Jake Heun in the second round on December 31, 2016 at WSOF 34.

Rama faced the Brazilian Ronny Markes on PFL Daytona on June 30, 2017, event that marked the debut of the Professional Fighters League, which was formerly known as World Series of Fighting. Rama lost by unanimous decision.

In June 2018, Rama entered the PFL Light Heavyweight Tournament. He faced Brandon Halsey in the opening round at PFL 2 on June 21, 2018. He lost the fight via TKO in the third round when the fight was stopped by the cage side doctor due to a cut Rama suffered.

In his second fight in the tournament, Rama faced Jamie Abdallah at PFL 7 on August 30, 2018. He won the fight via TKO between the second and third rounds when the doctor deemed Abdallah unable to continue due to swelling under his left eye. The win allowed Rama to advance to the next phase of the tournament.

Rama was set to face Bellator vet Jordan Young on April 29, 2021 at PFL 2 as the start of the 2021 PFL Light Heavyweight tournament. At the beginning of April, Rama was replaced by Vinny Magalhães for the whole season.

Championships and accomplishments
World Series of Fighting
WSOF Heavyweight Championship (One time)

2017 Top Prospect (Light-Heavyweight)
 https://www.flocombat.com/articles/5967168-flocombat-rankings-light-heavyweight-smealinho-rama-leads-way

2012 Rookie of the Year
 https://www.fightmatrix.com/fightmatrix-awards/

Mixed martial arts record

|-
|Loss
|align=center|11–5–1
|Sean O'Connell
|KO (punches)
| rowspan=2 | PFL 9
| rowspan=2 | 
| align=center| 1
| align=center| 1:45
| rowspan=2 | Long Beach, California, United States
|
|-
|Draw
|align=center|11–4–1
|Maxim Grishin
|Draw (majority)
| align=center| 2
| align=center| 5:00
|
|-
|Win
|align=center|11–4
|Jamie Abdallah
|TKO (doctor stoppage)
|PFL 7
|
|align=center| 2
|align=center| 5:00
|Atlantic City, New Jersey, United States
|
|-
|Loss
|align=center|10-4
|Brandon Halsey
|TKO (doctor stoppage)
|PFL 2
|
|align=center| 3
|align=center| 0:01
|Chicago, Illinois, United States
| 
|-
|Loss
|align=center|10-3
|Ronny Markes
|Decision (unanimous)
|PFL: Daytona
|June 30, 2017
|align=center|3
|align=center|5:00
|Daytona Beach, Florida, United States
|
|-
|Win
|align=center|10-2
|Jake Heun
|TKO (punches) 
|World Series of Fighting 34: Gaethje vs. Firmino
|December 31, 2016
|align=center|2
|align=center|3:30
|New York City, New York, United States
|
|-
|Loss
|align=center|9-2
|Blagoy Ivanov
|Submission (guillotine choke)
|World Series of Fighting 21: Palmer vs. Horodecki
|June 5, 2015
|align=center|3
|align=center|1:17
|Edmonton, Alberta, Canada
|Lost WSOF Heavyweight Championship
|-
|Win
|align=center|9-1
|Derrick Mehmen
|TKO (punches) 
|World Series of Fighting 14: Ford vs. Shields
|October 11, 2014
|align=center|1
|align=center|0:51
|Edmonton, Alberta, Canada
|Won WSOF Heavyweight Championship
|-
|Win
|align=center|8-1
|Tim Hague
|TKO (punches) 
|Unified - MMA 19
|May 23, 2014
|align=center|1
|align=center|1:41
|Edmonton, Alberta, Canada
|
|-
|Win
|align=center|7-1
|Steve Mocco
|Decision (unanimous)
|World Series of Fighting Canada 1: Ford vs. Powell
|February 21, 2014
|align=center|3
|align=center|5:00
|Edmonton, Alberta, Canada
|
|-
|Loss
|align=center|6-1
|Anthony Hamilton
|KO (head kick) 
|MFC 38: Behind Enemy Lines
|October 4, 2013
|align=center|2
|align=center|0:12
|Edmonton, Alberta, Canada
|For MFC Heavyweight Championship
|-
|Win
|align=center|6-0
|Mike Hackert
|KO (punches) 
|MFC 35: Reality Check
|February 15, 2013
|align=center|1
|align=center|2:28
|Edmonton, Alberta, Canada
|
|-
|Win
|align=center|5-0
|Ryan Fortin
|Submission (rear-naked choke)
|MFC 35: Explosive Encounter
|October 26, 2012
|align=center|1
|align=center|2:02
|Edmonton, Alberta, Canada
|
|-
|Win
|align=center|4-0
|Jordan Tracey
|Submission (kimura)
|Battle for the Border 1
|September 8, 2012
|align=center|1
|align=center|3:24
|Cranbrook, British Columbia, Canada
|
|-
|Win
|align=center|3-0
|Lee Mein
|TKO (punches) 
|MFC 34: Total Recall
|August 10, 2012
|align=center|1
|align=center|2:49
|Edmonton, Alberta, Canada
|
|-
|Win
|align=center|2-0
|Craig Hudson
|Submission (rear-naked choke)
|AFC 10 - Rise
|June 15, 2012
|align=center|1
|align=center|3:50
|Calgary, Alberta, Canada
|
|-
|Win
|align=center|1-0
|Demetrius Seguin
|TKO (punches) 
|HKFC - School of Hard Knocks 20
|February 24, 2012
|align=center|1
|align=center|0:13
|Medicine Hat, Alberta, Canada
|Pro Debut.

See also
List of current PFL fighters
List of male mixed martial artists
Maximum Fighting Championship

References

Living people
1992 births
Canadian male mixed martial artists
Canadian people of Greek descent
Heavyweight mixed martial artists
Light heavyweight mixed martial artists